Ruslan Bayzetovich Akhidzhak (born 8 March 1975) is a Russian professional football coach and a former player. He is coaching amateur teams.

Club career
He played 4 seasons in the Russian Football National League for FC Tom Tomsk.

Honours
 Russian Second Division Zone Siberia top scorer: 1994 (18 goals).

References

1975 births
Living people
Russian footballers
Russian football managers
Association football midfielders
FC Tom Tomsk players
FC Sibir Novosibirsk players
PFC Spartak Nalchik players
FC Yenisey Krasnoyarsk players
FC Zhetysu players
Kazakhstan Premier League players
Russian expatriate footballers
Expatriate footballers in Kazakhstan
Russian expatriate sportspeople in Kazakhstan
FC Torpedo NN Nizhny Novgorod players
Sportspeople from Tomsk